Alay  is a belde (town) in the central district (Niğde) of Niğde Province, Turkey. The population of the town is 3647 as of 2011  The town may be very old. According to Mayor's page it was named after İsmail Bahri Mahmut, a commander of a regiment. The settlement was declared a seat of township in 1988. The main crops of the town are potato and wheat.

References 

Towns in Turkey
Populated places in Niğde Province
Niğde Central District